The 2018 FIM Moto3 World Championship was a part of the 70th F.I.M. Road Racing World Championship season. Joan Mir was the reigning series champion, but he did not defend his title as he joined Moto2.

After winning at Sepang, Spanish rider Jorge Martín was crowned the 2018 Moto3 World Champion, having created an unassailable lead of 26 points over current runners-up Marco Bezzecchi.

The final race in Valencia saw wildcard rider Can Öncü become the youngest Grand Prix motorcycle racing winner at 15 years, 115 days.

Teams and riders

All the bikes used series-specified Dunlop tyres.

Rider changes
 Enea Bastianini moved to Leopard Racing, filling in the seat vacated by Joan Mir who moves up to Moto2, with Alonso López replacing Bastianini in Estrella Galicia 0,0.
 Sky VR46 rider Andrea Migno rode for Ángel Nieto Team, replacing Lorenzo Dalla Porta.
 Dennis Foggia made his full season debut in Moto3 with Sky Racing Team VR46, having previously competed as a replacement and wildcard rider in the 2017 season.
 Jaume Masiá made his full season debut at Moto3 with Bester Capital Dubai after previously competing as a replacement rider for the team in the 2017 season.
 Marco Bezzecchi moved from CIP to MC Saxoprint, replacing Patrik Pulkkinen.
 Niccolò Antonelli moved from Red Bull KTM Ajo to SIC58 Squadra Corse.
 After his full season debut with SIC58 Squadra Corse, Tony Arbolino moved to Marinelli Rivacold Snipers.
 Darryn Binder rode for Red Bull KTM Ajo, replacing Bo Bendsneyder who graduated to Moto2 with Tech 3.
 Lorenzo Dalla Porta raced with Leopard Racing, replacing Livio Loi, who moved to Reale Avintia Academy.
 Makar Yurchenko made his Moto3 debut with CIP, replacing Manuel Pagliani.
 Both Romano Fenati and Jules Danilo moved up to Moto2, joining Marinelli Rivacold Snipers and SAG Racing Team respectively.
 John McPhee joined the CIP team as British Talent Team hiatus.
 María Herrera left Moto3 for the Supersport 300 World Championship.
 Juan Francisco Guevara didn't continue with the RBA BOE Racing Team after he announced his retirement from professional racing due to personal reasons. He replaced by the 2017 Red Bull Rookies Cup champion Kazuki Masaki.

Mid-season changes
 Makar Yurchenko left the CIP - Green Power after his contract was terminated by mutual agreement due to inconsistent race results. He was replaced by Stefano Nepa from Dutch TT onwards to join CIP - Green Power for the remainder of the season.
 Reale Avintia Academy expanded to enter a second bike, which will be ridden by Vicente Pérez. Reale Avintia will race under the name of "Reale Avintia Academy 77" from Catalan motorcycle Grand Prix onwards in honor of the late Andreas Pérez. Livio Loi left the Reale Avintia midway through the season due to inconsistent race results, managing only 8 points over 8 races. He will be replaced by Vicente for the remainder of the season.
 Darryn Binder missed the German motorcycle Grand Prix due to injury, he was replaced by the Spaniard Raúl Fernández.
 Arón Canet missed the Thailand motorcycle Grand Prix due to injury, he was replaced by Jeremy Alcoba.

Team changes
 Mahindra and Peugeot withdrew from the Championship after the 2017 season. Ángel Nieto Team, Redox PrüstelGP, and CIP - Green Power switched to KTM as a result of their withdrawal.
 AGR Team folded its operations in both Moto2 and Moto3 following the 2017 Aragon GP due to financial issues coupled with poor performance throughout the 2017 season.
 British Talent Team's Moto3 team put in a temporary hiatus for the next few years starting from 2018.
 Marinelli Snipers have downsized to one bike in exchange for one slot in Moto2.
 Avintia Racing returned to Moto3 after a five-season hiatus. They joined forces with Team Stylobike to form Reale Stylobike, fielding a KTM for Livio Loi.
 Red Bull KTM Ajo also downsized to one bike.

Calendar
The following Grands Prix were scheduled to take place in 2018:

 ‡ = Night race

Calendar changes

 The British Grand Prix was scheduled to move from Silverstone to the new Circuit of Wales, but construction on the new track has not commenced. The two circuits reached a deal that will see Silverstone with an option to host the 2018 race.
The Thailand Grand Prix is a new addition to the calendar, with the race scheduled for 7 October.
The Catalan Grand Prix used a new configuration of the Circuit de Barcelona-Catalunya, wherein the previous set of corners of turns 13, 14 and 15 was combined into a sweeping right corner. The new layout was previously used in Formula 1 from 2004 to 2006.

Results and standings

Grands Prix

Riders' standings
Scoring system
Points were awarded to the top fifteen finishers. A rider had to finish the race to earn points.

Constructors' standings
Scoring system
Points were awarded to the top fifteen finishers. A rider had to finish the race to earn points.

 Each constructor got the same number of points as their best placed rider in each race.

Teams' standings
The teams' standings were based on results obtained by regular and substitute riders; wild-card entries were ineligible.

Notes

References

Moto3
Grand Prix motorcycle racing seasons